Spokane is a ghost town located in Custer County, South Dakota, United States. It was a mining camp in the Black Hills.

Naming
Spokane was named after Spokane, Washington, via a local silver mine.

History
Spokane was originally intended to be a gold mining town, but the Spokane Mine also produced silver, lead, beryl, copper, mica, hematite, graphite, and zinc. Both the town and mine were founded in 1890. 1927 was one of the town's best years, when the town's profits totaled $144,742. The town turned this money into a school, and several new miners entered the area. The mine soon began to fail again, and it closed in 1940. By this decade, the town was already largely abandoned. In the 1950s, a few companies unsuccessfully tried to reopen the mine. The mine's buildings eventually burned down, and others that were deemed unsafe were destroyed by the U.S. Forest Service. A watchman remained in the town until the mid-1980s, and after that, the town was officially abandoned.

The remains of the town include the schoolhouse, a few old cars, a root cellar, and a few foundations.

Geography
Spokane was located in the Black Hills in Custer County. It is 16 miles east of Custer.

External links
 YouTube video of Spokane, SD in 2012

References

Ghost towns in South Dakota
Geography of Custer County, South Dakota